The UK Albums Chart is one of many music charts compiled by the Official Charts Company that calculates the best-selling albums of the week in the United Kingdom. Since 2004 the chart has been based on the sales of both physical albums and digital downloads. This list shows albums that peaked in the Top 10 of the UK Albums Chart during 2009, as well as albums which peaked in 2008 and 2010 but were in the top 10 in 2009. The entry date is when the album appeared in the top 10 for the first time (week ending, as published by the Official Charts Company, which is six days after the chart is announced).

One-hundred and forty-seven albums were in the top ten this year. One album from 2007 and seventeen albums from 2008 remained in the top 10 for several weeks at the beginning of the year, while Crazy Love by Michael Bublé, Lungs by Florence + the Machine, Only Revolutions by Biffy Clyro and The Hits by Will Young were all released in 2009 but did not reach their peak until 2010. I Am... Sasha Fierce by Beyoncé was the only album from 2008 to reach its peak in 2009. Thirteen artists scored multiple entries in the top 10 in 2009. Florence + the Machine, Flo Rida, Lady Gaga, Taylor Swift and Tinchy Stryder were among the many artists who achieved their first UK charting top 10 album in 2009.

The 2008 Christmas number-one album, The Circus by Take That, remained at the top spot for the first two weeks of 2009. Only by the Night by Kings of Leon and the self titled album by The Script both returned for single weeks at number-one after first topping the chart in September and August 2008 respectively. The first new number-one album of the year was To Lose My Life... by White Lies. Overall, twenty-nine different albums peaked at number-one in 2009, with twenty-nine unique artists hitting that position.

Background

Vera Lynn becomes oldest living artist to achieve UK number-one album
On 13 September 2009 (19 September 2009, week ending), Vera Lynn, known as "The Forces Sweetheart", made chart history when, at 92 years and 6 months old, she became the oldest living artist to achieve a UK number-one album when her compilation We'll Meet Again: The Very Best of Vera Lynn, topped the UK Albums Chart, having entered the top 10 at number two the previous week. The album is a selection of her recordings made for Decca Records, for whom Lynn recorded between 1936 and 1959.

Multiple entries
One-hundred and forty-seven albums charted in the top 10 in 2009, with one-hundred and twenty-six albums reaching their peak this year (including Abbey Road, Bad, Hits Out of Hell, Number Ones, Off the Wall, Revolver, Rubber Soul, Sgt. Pepper's Lonely Hearts Club Band, The Essential Michael Jackson, The Sound of Girls Aloud: The Greatest Hits, The Stone Roses, The Very Best of Fleetwood Mac and Thriller, which charted in previous years but reached a peak on their latest chart run).

Thirteen artists scored multiple entries in the top 10 in 2009. Michael Jackson had nine albums reaching the top ten. George Harrison had five entries, four of which were with The Beatles. Cheryl had one solo album and two with her group Girls Aloud. Bruce Springsteen, Ian Brown, Katherine Jenkins, Leona Lewis, Pink, The Saturdays, Seasick Steve and Take That were the other acts who had two top 10 albums this year. Katherine Jenkins and The Saturdays' two entries were both released this year.

Chart debuts
Twenty-six artists achieved their first top 10 album in 2009 as a lead artist.

The following table (collapsed on desktop site) does not include acts who had previously charted as part of a group and secured their first top 10 solo album, or featured appearances on compilations or other artists recordings.

Notes
Girl group The Saturdays included among its members Rochelle Humes and Frankie Sandford, who had previously been a part of S Club Juniors (later S Club 8). Their debut album Together reached number five in 2002. Yusuf was formerly known as Yusuf Islam and Cat Stevens - Roadsinger was his first charting album under this shortened name.

E Street Band had their first top 10 album officially credited by the Official Charts Company this year, although they had featured on much of Bruce Springsteen's back-catalogue. Cheryl launched a solo career in 2009 with her debut 3 Words. She was still an active part of the group Girls Aloud, who had reached the album chart top 10 on five occasions by this point.

Best-selling albums
Susan Boyle had the best-selling album of the year with I Dreamed a Dream. The album spent seven weeks in the top 10 (including four weeks at number one), sold almost 1.633 million copies and was certified 7× platinum by the BPI. The Fame by Lady Gaga came in second place. Michael Bublé's Crazy Love, The E.N.D. from The Black Eyed Peas and Only by the Night by Kings of Leon made up the top five. Albums by JLS, Beyoncé, Paolo Nutini, Lily Allen and Robbie Williams were also in the top ten best-selling albums of the year.

Top-ten albums
Key

Entries by artist
The following table shows artists who achieved two or more top 10 entries in 2009, including albums that reached their peak in 2008. The figures only include main artists, with featured artists and appearances on compilation albums not counted individually for each artist. The total number of weeks an artist spent in the top ten in 2009 is also shown.

Notes

 Lungs reached its peak of number-one on 23 January 2010 (week ending).
 Thriller 25 re-entered the top 10 at number 9 on 18 July 2009 (week ending) after the death of Michael Jackson.
 Rockferry re-entered the top 10 at number 4 on 28 February 2009 (week ending) for 3 weeks.
 The Seldom Seen Kid re-entered the top 10 at number 6 on 14 February 2009 (week ending) and at number 5 on 28 February 2009 (week ending) for 3 weeks.
 We Started Nothing re-entered the top 10 at number 9 on 17 January 2009 (week ending) and at number 8 on 28 February 2009 (week ending) for 3 weeks.
 The Script re-entered the top 10 at number 8 on 10 January 2009 (week ending) for 6 weeks.
 King of Pop re-entered the top 10 at number 5 on 11 July 2009 (week ending) after the death of Michael Jackson.
 Only By the Night re-entered the top 10 at number 6 on 27 June 2009 (week ending) for 2 weeks and at number 4 on 12 September 2009 (week ending) for 4 weeks.
 The Best Bette re-entered the top 10 at number 6 on 21 February 2009 (week ending) and at number 9 on 28 March 2009 (week ending).
 Songs for You, Truths for Me re-entered the top 10 at number 7 on 17 January 2009 (week ending) for 6 weeks, at number 9 on 11 April 2009 (week ending), at number 9 on 25 April 2009 (week ending) and at number 9 on 5 September 2009 (week ending) for 2 weeks.
 I Started Out with Nothin and I Still Got Most of It Left re-entered the top 10 at number 9 on 28 February 2009 (week ending).
 Funhouse re-entered the top 10 at number 10 on 3 January 2009 (week ending) and at number 10 on 2 May 2009 (week ending) for 6 weeks.
 I Am... Sasha Fierce re-entered the top 10 at number 10 on 11 April 2009 (week ending) for 9 weeks and at number 5 on 15 August 2009 (week ending) for 4 weeks.
 Day & Age re-entered the top 10 at number 10 on 7 February 2009 (week ending) for 5 weeks.
 The Circus re-entered the top 10 at number 8 on 7 March 2009 (week ending) for 4 weeks and at number 4 on 4 July 2009 (week ending).
 The Sound of Girls Aloud: The Greatest Hits originally peaked at number-one upon its initial release in 2006.
 Oracular Spectacular re-entered the top 10 at number 10 on 31 January 2009 (week ending).
 The Fame re-entered the top 10 at number 5 on 4 July 2009 (week ending) for 9 weeks. Following the release of The Fame Monster, it re-entered the top 10 at number 7 on 5 December 2009 (week ending) and at number 2 on 19 December 2009 (week ending) for 41 weeks.
 Fleet Foxes re-entered the top 10 at number 10 on 28 February 2009 (week ending) for 3 weeks.
 It's Not Me, It's You re-entered the top 10 at number 6 on 4 April 2009 (week ending) for 12 weeks.
 Invaders Must Die re-entered the top 10 at number 7 on 4 April 2009 (week ending) for 2 weeks and at number 10 on 25 April 2009 (week ending) for 8 weeks.
 Wild Young Hearts re-entered the top 10 at number 9 on 1 August 2009 (week ending) for 2 weeks and at number 9 on 22 August 2009 (week ending).
 Pink Box includes three of Pink's studio albums (I'm Not Dead, Missundaztood and Try This) along with the DVD Pink: Live in Europe, a recording of a show from her Try This tour, filmed in Manchester in 2004. 
 Sunny Side Up re-entered the top 10 at number 6 on 25 July 2009 (week ending) for 8 weeks, at number 5 on 24 October 2009 (week ending) for 3 weeks, at number-one on 9 January 2010 (week ending) for 19 weeks and at number 8 on 14 August 2010 (week ending) for 3 weeks.
 West Ryder Pauper Lunatic Asylum re-entered the top 10 at number 10 on 1 August 2009 (week ending) for 5 weeks.
 The E.N.D. re-entered the top 10 at number 8 on 1 August 2009 (week ending) for 7 weeks, at number 10 on 14 November 2009 (week ending) for 10 weeks, at number 10 on 20 February 2010 (week ending) for 2 weeks, at number 10 on 15 May 2010 (week ending) for 2 weeks and at number 3 on 3 July 2010 (week ending) for 2 weeks.
 Hits Out of Hell originally peaked at number 2 upon its initial release in 1985.
 Number Ones originally peaked at number-one upon its initial release in 2003. It returned to the top 10 after the death of Michael Jackson.
 Thriller originally peaked at number-one upon its initial release in 1982. It returned to the top 10 after the death of Michael Jackson.
 The Essential Michael Jackson originally peaked at number 2 upon its initial release in 2005. It returned to the top 10 at a new peak of number-one after the death of Michael Jackson.
 Off the Wall originally peaked at number 5 upon its initial release in 1979. It returned to the top 10, rising to a new peak of number three, after the death of Michael Jackson.
 Bad originally peaked at number-one upon its initial release in 1987. It returned to the top 10 after the death of Michael Jackson.
 Lungs re-entered the top 10 at number 10 on 26 September 2009 (week ending), at number 6 on 9 January 2010 (week ending) for 17 weeks, at number 6 on 15 May 2010 (week ending) for 5 weeks and at number 10 on 31 July 2010 (week ending).
 The Stone Roses originally peaked outside the top ten at number 19 upon its initial release in 1989. It entered the top 10 for the first time in 2004, peaking at number nine. In 2009, the album was re-released to mark its 20th anniversary and reached its highest peak of number five.
 One Love re-entered the top 10 at number 10 on 10 July 2010 (week ending).
 The Beatles album back catalogue was re-issued in 2009 in digitally remastered versions. They were released individually as well as part of the boxset The Beatles (The Original Studio Recordings).
 Sgt. Pepper's Lonely Hearts Club Band originally charted at its peak of number-one upon its initial release in 1967, spending 27 weeks at the top spot across 1967 and 1968. It was re-issued in 1987 and re-entered the top 10 at number 3 on 13 June 1987 (week ending) for three weeks. It made the top 10 again on 27 June 1992 (week ending), peaking at number 6. 
 Abbey Road originally charted at its peak of number-one upon its initial release in 1969, spending 17 weeks at the top spot across 1969 and 1970. It was re-issued in 1987 when it peaked outside the top ten at number 30. 
 Revolver originally charted at its peak of number-one upon its initial release in 1966, spending 7 weeks at the top spot that year. It was re-issued in 1987 when it peaked outside the top ten at number 55.
 Rubber Soul originally charted at its peak of number-one upon its initial release in 1965, spending 8 weeks at the top spot across 1965 and 1966. It was re-issued in 1987 when it peaked outside the top ten at number 60.
 The Resistance re-entered the top 10 at number 8 on 9 January 2010 (week ending).
 The Blueprint 3 re-entered the top 10 at number 10 on 27 February 2010 (week ending).
 Turn It Up re-entered the top 10 at number 10 on 23 January 2010 (week ending) for 3 weeks, at number 10 on 19 June 2010 (week ending) and at number 9 on 30 October 2010 (week ending).
 With the album We'll Meet Again: The Very Best of Vera Lynn, she became the oldest living artist (92) to have a number-one album on the UK Album Chart.
 Crazy Love re-entered the top 10 at number 8 on 20 February 2010 (week ending), at number 6 on 20 March 2010 (week ending), at number 2 on 5 June 2010 (week ending) for 5 weeks, at number 10 on 7 August 2010 (week ending) for 5 weeks, at number 7 on 30 October 2010 (week ending) for 11 weeks and at number 7 on 16 April 2011 (week ending).
 The Very Best of Fleetwood Mac originally peaked at number 7 on its initial release in 2002.
 JLS re-entered the top 10 at number 8 on 6 March 2010 (week ending).
 Reality Killed the Video Star re-entered the top 10 at number 6 on 26 December 2009 (week ending) for 2 weeks and at number 8 on 27 February 2010 (week ending).
 Only Revolutions re-entered the top 10 at number 9 on 6 February 2010 (week ending) and at number 3 on 11 September 2010 (week ending) for 2 weeks.
 3 Words re-entered the top 10 at number 10 on 2 January 2010 (week ending).
 Soulbook re-entered the top 10 at number 9 on 19 December 2009 (week ending).
 Echo re-entered the top 10 at number 9 on 26 December 2009 (week ending).
 Figure includes a top 10 album with the group The Stone Roses.
 Figure includes two top 10 albums with the group Girls Aloud.
 Figure includes four top 10 albums with the group The Beatles.
 Figure includes album that peaked in 2007.
 Figure includes album that peaked in 2008.
 Figure includes album that first charted in 2008 but peaked in 2009.
 Figure includes album that peaked in 2010.

See also
2009 in British music
List of number-one albums from the 2000s (UK)

References
General

Specific

External links
2009 album chart archive at the Official Charts Company (click on relevant week)

United Kingdom top 10 albums
Top 10 albums
2009